St. John's Parish refers to the ecclesiastical parish of hundreds of churches; in secular (official governmental) use it refers to:

St John's (Parish), Barbados
St. John's Parish, Prince Edward Island, Canada
St John's (Parish), Clontarf, formed in 1966

See also 
Saint John Parish (disambiguation)
St. John's Church (disambiguation)
St. John the Baptist Church (disambiguation)
St. John's Cathedral (disambiguation)
St. John's Chapel (disambiguation)
St. John's Episcopal Church (disambiguation)
St. John the Evangelist Church (disambiguation)